Eugene S. Turner (June 14, 1824 – July 15, 1915) was an American jurist and legislator.

Born in East Oswego, New York to Joseph and Mary Turner, moved with his parents to Wisconsin Territory in 1840 and settled near present-day Waukesha. Turner studied law and was admitted to the Wisconsin bar in 1846. He served as assistant secretary of the Wisconsin Territorial Executive Council from 1846 to 1847. In 1850 (the 3rd Wisconsin Legislature), Turner served in the Wisconsin State Assembly, succeeding fellow Democrat James Fagan. He also served as District Attorney for Washington County, Wisconsin, postmaster at Port Washington, and county judge of Ozaukee County. 

When an 1848 convention of former members of the Wisconsin State Legislature was held on the occasion of the Golden jubilee of Wisconsin statehood, Turner was the senior member present, and spoke briefly. Turner died in Port Washington.

Notes

1824 births
1915 deaths
Politicians from Oswego, New York
People from Port Washington, Wisconsin
District attorneys in Wisconsin
Wisconsin state court judges
Members of the Wisconsin State Assembly
Wisconsin postmasters
Politicians from Waukesha, Wisconsin
People from Washington County, Wisconsin
19th-century American judges